KKS Polonia Warsaw - is a Polish professional men's basketball club based in Warsaw, currently playing in the basketball 1 Men's Basketball League.

History
The team was founded in 1911. In 1959, the team won the national Polish championship. In the 1959–60 season, Polonia was a semi-finalist in the FIBA European Champions Cup. In 2003, 2004 and 2005 the team reached the PLK Semifinals. The 2010–11 season was the last one for Polonia in the PLK.

Honours and titles
Polish Championship:
Winners (1): 1959
Runners-up (10): 1929, 1930, 1931, 1932, 1934, 1935, 1939, 1953–54, 1956–57, 1959–60, 1975–76
3nd place (4): 1933, 1971–72, 2003–04, 2004–05
Polish Cup:
Winners (3): 1934, 1969, 1975

Notable players

  Bohdan Bartosiewicz
  Dardan Berisha
  Darnell Hinson
  Henryk Jaźnicki
  Łukasz Koszarek
  Kamil Łączyński
  Arkadiusz Miłoszewski
  Jeff Nordgaard
  Andrzej Pasiorowski
  Krzysztof Szubarga
  Witold Zagórski

See also
 Polonia Warsaw
 Polonia Warsaw (women's basketball)

References

External links
Official website (in Polish)
Eurobasket.com - Team profile

Polonia Warsaw
Basketball teams established in 1925
Basketball teams in Poland
1925 establishments in Poland
Sport in Warsaw